Tubulin beta-4B chain formerly known as tubulin beta-2C chain is a protein that in humans is encoded by the TUBB4B gene.

References

Further reading

External links